Stockton Collegiate International Schools (SCIS) is a public charter school located in Stockton, California, serving grades kindergarten through 12th. Stockton Collegiate International Schools opened two public charter institutions on September 7, 2010, in downtown Stockton, CA. Stockton Collegiate offers three International Baccalaureate Programmes: Primary Years Programme (K-5), Middle Years Programme (6-10) and Diploma Program (11-12).  Diploma Programme students sit for IB tests (at either Standard Level (SL) or Higher Level (HL)) each spring. This school is also one of the only schools in the world to be an IB school from k-12 grades.

References

External links 
 Stockton Collegiate Website
 Stockton Collegiate Facebook Page

High schools in San Joaquin County, California
Charter K-12 schools in California
International Baccalaureate schools in California
2010 establishments in California